Till Marriage Do Us Part (also known as How Long Can You Fall?) is a 1974 Italian erotic comedy film written and directed by Luigi Comencini and starring Laura Antonelli. Released in the U.S. in 1979, it was nominated to the 37th  Golden Globe Awards for  Best Foreign Language Film.

Plot  
The Marquise Eugenia di Maqueda, an orphan raised by the nuns, marries Raimondo Corrao, but on their wedding night she finds out that he is her brother. The piece of news is in a letter written from Paris by their father, a womanizer who lives and hides from them in the French head town. The pair decide, to avoid the scandal, to live as brother and sister. Publicly, they take a vow of abstinence to "achieve sainthood" instead of consummating their marriage. He will later leave for the war in Libya, she will find solace and sexual satisfaction in the arms of the family chauffeur.

Cast 

Laura Antonelli: Eugenia Di Maqueda
Alberto Lionello: Raimondo Corrao, Marquis Di Maqueda
Michele Placido: Silvano Pennacchini 
Jean Rochefort: Baron Henri De Sarcey
Ugo Pagliai: Ruggero Di Maqueda
Rosemarie Dexter: Florida 
Karin Schubert: Evelyn
Michele Abruzzo: Don Pacifico

See also       
 List of Italian films of 1974

References

External links

1974 films
Italian comedy films
1974 comedy films
Films directed by Luigi Comencini
Commedia all'italiana
Incest in film
Films set in Sicily
Films set in Paris
Films set in Rome
Films shot in Paris
Adultery in films
Films set in the 1910s
Films set in the 1920s
Films scored by Fiorenzo Carpi
1970s Italian-language films
1970s Italian films